Tic:Toc, also known as Tic:Toc Home Loans, is an Australian FinTech company and non-bank home lender based in Adelaide, South Australia. Founded in 2015, but launched to the public in July 2017, Tic:Toc offers automated digital home loans to consumers while selling their automation technology to other lending businesses. Bendigo and Adelaide Bank are a major shareholder, owning a 27 percent stake in the business.

History 
Tic:Toc was founded in 2015 by Anthony Baum, and secured seed funding in 2016 from Bendigo and Adelaide Bank, who also provide the funds for Tic:Toc’s home loans. In March 2017, the company closed its Series A funding round, securing A$4.1 million in further funds from Bendigo and Adelaide Bank.

The company officially launched its home loan offering in July 2017. In December 2017, Tic:Toc announced an expansion of services to include Tasmania, officially expanding their serviceable area to cover all states of Australia.

Tic:Toc closed a Series B funding round in July 2018, raising A$11.5 million. The raise was led by La Trobe Financial and Genworth Financial’s Australian arm, Genworth Mortgage Insurance Australia.

In November 2018, Tic:Toc announced it would offer their technology to Bendigo and Adelaide Bank as part of their first enterprise partnership. In March 2019, Bendigo Bank launched Bendigo Express, a digital home loan white-labelled under the Bendigo Bank brand.

On February 5 2020, Tic:Toc launched its first software offering, XAI Validate, which uses artificial intelligence and machine learning to automate the validation of customer data.

Yasmin Allen was appointed chairman of the board in November 2021. 

Tic:Toc closed a Series D funding round in December 2022, raising A$54 million. The raise was led by Regal Funds Management and is made up of A$30 million raised in February, with a further A$24 million raised from existing investors Bendigo and Adelaide Bank and IAG Firemark Ventures .

Qantas Money Home Loans launched in early February 2023, and is a white-label mortgage product of Tic:Toc and funded by Bendigo and Adelaide Bank.

References 

Financial services companies established in 2015
Mortgage industry of Australia
Companies based in Adelaide
Financial services companies of Australia